Sequim Bay is a bay in northwestern Washington, on the Olympic Peninsula. The bay is on the Strait of Juan de Fuca of the Pacific Ocean and is located east of Sequim, Washington and north of Blyn.

The name "Sequim" comes from a Native American word for "quiet water," as two large, overlapping sandbars protect the bay.

Sequim Bay State Park is located on the shore of Sequim Bay.

References

Bays of Washington (state)
Bodies of water of Clallam County, Washington
Washington placenames of Native American origin